Rob Russell (born 13 January 1999) is an Irish rugby union player, currently playing for United Rugby Championship and European Rugby Champions Cup side Leinster. His preferred position is wing or fullback.

Leinster
Russell was named in the Leinster Rugby academy for the 2021–22 season.

References

External links
itsrugby.co.uk Profile

1999 births
Living people
Rugby union players from Dublin (city)
Irish rugby union players
Leinster Rugby players
Rugby union wings
Rugby union fullbacks